Nuri Turan (4 July 1924 – 5 January 2016) was a Turkish athlete. He competed in the men's shot put and the men's discus throw at the 1952 Summer Olympics.

References

External links
 

1924 births
2016 deaths
Athletes (track and field) at the 1952 Summer Olympics
Turkish male shot putters
Turkish male discus throwers
Olympic athletes of Turkey
Place of birth missing
Mediterranean Games bronze medalists for Turkey
Mediterranean Games medalists in athletics
Athletes (track and field) at the 1951 Mediterranean Games